Popoloca  is an indigenous Mexican cluster of languages of the Popolocan branch of the Oto-Manguean language family, closely related to Mazatec. They are spoken by 17,000 people
in Puebla state, Mexico, near Tehuacán.

Languages
The Ethnologue distinguishes seven varieties of Popoloca as separate languages. However, these fall into four groups with 75% mutual intelligibility or greater.
Eastern Popoloca
Southern (Atzingo–Metzontla: San Juan, Los Reyes)
Northern (Temalacayuca–Tlacoyalco: San Luis, San Marcos)
 Central Popoloca
Coyotepec (San Mateo dialect may be distinct, or a dialect of San Felipe)
Western (Ahuatempan–Otlaltepec: Santa Inés, San Felipe)

Notes

Popolocan languages
Articles citing INALI